HC Sierre is a professional ice hockey team, in Switzerland currently playing in the Swiss League (SL). Sierre has played in each of the top Swiss hockey leagues the National League (NL) and Swiss League (SL). It has also played several years in the lower tiers of the ice hockey leagues system in Switzerland. Sierre the affiliate to National League club Genève-Servette HC, agreeing to a four-year partnership through 2022.

After claiming the MySports League (MSL) Championship, formerly the Regio league, with a victory over HC Valais-Chablais in the 2018–19 season, HC Sierre was promoted to return to the Swiss League on 30 March 2019.

Honors
National League B Championships: (2) 1967, 1968
MySports League Championship:(1)  2019

References

External links
 Official website 
 Town website 

Ice hockey teams in Switzerland
Sport in Valais
Sierre